The Ayrshire Junior Football League, known as the Western Junior League from 1919 until 1968, was a football league competition operated in Ayrshire under the Scottish Junior Football Association which operated until a merger in 2002.

The league was formed in the aftermath of World War I, primarily from clubs in the territory which today is North Ayrshire that had participated in smaller leagues such as the Irvine & District competition. After only a few years of operation, the Western clubs became embroiled in the Intermediate dispute relating to compensation payments due to clubs joining Scottish Football League teams, and along with the larger and more powerful Glasgow Junior Football League, broke away from the SJFA and its flagship tournament, the Scottish Junior Cup in 1927 to form a rival Intermediate Association, although still playing in a separate division from the Glasgow clubs.

The dispute was resolved in 1931 and the Western League resumed alongside a new Central League for the Glasgow clubs, with the former Scottish Intermediate Cup which had been contested between them now named the West of Scotland Junior Cup as an additional trophy to the Scottish Cup, with clubs from the Lanarkshire Junior Football League also taking part. The membership was soon expanded in 1934 with a group of clubs from the mining villages of south-east Ayrshire whose local league, founded in 1920 had folded (clubs in the north had been reluctant to admit them previously due to travel difficulties involved, a factor which had also prevented local clubs joining other leagues such as the Scottish Junior Football League in the past).

In 1968 the Junior football system across Scotland was reorganised, with Lanarkshire's league merging with the Central setup. The league in Ayrshire remained largely unchanged as one of six across the country, although the name was changed from the Western League to the Ayrshire Regional League and the few clubs which had been playing in it which were not based in the region moved to the Central leagues. From 1946 to 1976 the league was divided into North and South sections with the winners in a playoff to decide the overall champion, and thereafter two merit divisions were formed with a dozen clubs in each and promotion/relegation between them. It was at this point that Auchinleck Talbot, Scottish Cup winners in the 1940s but never a consistent force and without a major trophy in several years, rose to dominate the Junior grade at both regional and national levels, which generally continued into the 21st century.

The divisional setup remained until 2002, when the largest clubs in Ayrshire and Central merged under a two-tier Super League within a new Scottish Junior Football Association, West Region to increase the number of lucrative matches to be played between them (the three regions in the east of the country did likewise). A lower division of the West Region was designated specifically for legacy Ayrshire clubs in parallel with two for Central clubs, until 2018 when it was decided to organise all divisions on a regional basis. Some local cups still retained the link to Ayrshire.

Champions

1919–1968 era
Key:

1968–2002 era

Key:

Notes

List of winners

Notes

References

 Scottish Junior FA Structure, Scottish Junior Football Association
Non-League Scotland (archive version), with club progression by season 1990 to 2007)

1921 establishments in Scotland
2002 disestablishments in Scotland
Sports leagues established in 1919
Sports leagues disestablished in 2002
Defunct Scottish Junior Football Association leagues
Football in East Ayrshire
Football in North Ayrshire
Football in South Ayrshire
Scottish Junior Football Association, West Region